Hymenostephium rivularis is a species of flowering plants in the family Asteraceae. It is native to Central America and western South America (Colombia, Ecuador, Peru, Bolivia)

References

Heliantheae
Taxa named by Eduard Friedrich Poeppig